Danny Weis (pronounced ; born September 28, 1948 in Huntington Park, California) is an American guitarist, best known as a founding member of both Iron Butterfly and Rhinoceros, as well as co-writer of Rhinoceros's only charting single, "Apricot Brandy". Though he left Iron Butterfly after only one album due to internal tensions, his work was an influence in the band for most of their history, since his replacement Erik Brann made a conscious effort to imitate his playing. Weis later recounted "Erik Braunn replaced me in Iron Butterfly, and if I remember correctly, he bought a lot of my equipment, some of my clothes, they tried to clone me basically..."

Weis appeared on Iron Butterfly's first two singles, "Don't Look Down On Me" and "Possession", and their debut LP Heavy. In addition, the later album Live included a performance of "You Can't Win", a song from Heavy for which Weis wrote the music.

After leaving Iron Butterfly, Weis became a founding member of Rhinoceros and played on all three of their albums. "Apricot Brandy", an instrumental he co-wrote with Rhinoceros keyboardist Michael Fonfara, reached No. 46 on the Billboard Hot 100 and has been used as background music on a number of TV shows.

After Rhinoceros disbanded in 1970, Weis briefly served as a member of The Rascals. He then reunited with several fellow members of Rhinoceros to form the band Blackstone, which broke up after one commercially unsuccessful album.

In 1974 Weis played lead guitar on Lou Reed's Sally Can't Dance album and on the subsequent world tour.

In 1979 Weis appeared as the Band Leader and Guitarist of "The Rose Band" in the movie The Rose with Bette Midler.

In December 2006, his debut solo album, an instrumental smooth jazz effort titled Sweet Spot, was released on Marshmellow Records.

References

External links
Danny Weis Official Website

1948 births
Living people
People from Huntington Park, California
American rock guitarists
American male guitarists
Iron Butterfly members
20th-century American guitarists
20th-century American male musicians
Rhinoceros (band) members